

The 1972 Australia rugby union tour of New Zealand and Fiji was a series of thirteen rugby union matches, including three tests, played by the Wallabies in New Zealand, plus a one-off test match played by the Wallabies against the Fijians in Fiji. The tour took place in August and September 1972.

The test series in New Zealand was won by the All Blacks with three wins from three matches. The test match in Fiji was won by the Wallabies.

Results 
Scores and results list Australia's points tally first.

Squad leadership
The Wallaby squad was captained by Greg Davis  described by Howell as "a leader of men who believed a leader should lead....a single minded flanker who gave no quarter and asked for none". Davis was making his seventh and final overseas tour with the Wallabies, his third as captain. Howell writes that for Davis at 33 years and the end of a magnificent career, the seven loss & five win result of the tour was "a disaster and occasioned Davis' retirement". An injury picked up in New Zealand prevented Davis from leading the side in the Test match in Fiji on the way home. Peter Sullivan led the Wallabies to a narrow 21-19 victory against Fiji. He had already captained Australia in two mid-week games during the New Zealand leg. The third Test in New Zealand, a 38-3 romp by the All Blacks was Greg Davis' last match.

Joe French was the Tour Manager. Bob Templeton was the team's coach who carried the traditional touring title of Assistant Manager.

References

Australia
Australia national rugby union team tours
Australia national rugby union team tours of New Zealand
tour
tour
Rugby union tours of Fiji
1972 in Fijian rugby union